"Drive, She Said" is a song by the American singer-songwriter Stan Ridgway and is the third single released in support of his 1985 debut album The Big Heat.

Formats and track listing 
All songs written by Stan Ridgway, except where noted.

Netherlands 7" single (A 7026)
"Drive, She Said" – 4:23
"Rio Greyhound" – 3:11

Netherlands 12" single (A 12.7026)
"Drive, She Said" – 4:23
"Rio Greyhound" – 3:11
"Can't Stop the Show" – 3:43

Australian 7" single (ES 1120)
"Drive, She Said" – 4:23
"Twisted" – 3:35

Charts

References

External links 
 

1985 songs
1985 singles
1986 singles
I.R.S. Records singles
Stan Ridgway songs
Songs written by Stan Ridgway
Song recordings produced by Hugh Jones (producer)